Kajaki: The True Story, released in North America as Kilo Two Bravo, is a 2014 British war docu-drama film directed by Paul Katis in his feature debut, written by Tom Williams, and produced by Katis and Andrew de Lotbiniere.

The plot is based on the Kajaki Dam incident, involving Mark Wright and a small unit of British soldiers positioned near the Kajaki Dam, in Helmand province, Afghanistan.

Cast

 David Elliot as Mark Wright
 Mark Stanley as Tug
 Scott Kyle as Stu Pearson
 Benjamin O'Mahony as Stuart Hale
 Bryan Parry as Jonesy
 Liam Ainsworth as Ken Barlow
 Ali Cook as Spud McMellon
 Andy Gibbins as Smudge
 Grant Kilburn as Alex Craig
 John Doughty as Dave Prosser
 Jon-Paul Bell as Luke Mauro
 Malachi Kirby as Snoop
 Paul Luebke as Jay Davis
 Ryan W. Sadi as Kyle Minchew
 Robert Mitchell as Faz
 Thomas Davison as Jarhead
 Abe Dababneh as Kajaki Jon
 Felipe Cabezas as Kajaki Mike
 Hazem Alagha as Steven "Bombhead" Watson

Production
The film was shot on location at Al-Kafrein, Jordan, as a stand-in for Afghanistan.

Release
Kajaki premiered on 12 November 2014 at London's Vue Cinema in Leicester Square and was attended by cast, crew and veterans. The film was released in the United Kingdom on 28 November 2014 and in the United States on 13 November 2015.

Reception

Box office
Kajaki grossed $7,891 in the United States and Canada and $26,126 in other territories for a worldwide total of $34,017.

Critical response

On review aggregator Rotten Tomatoes it has an approval rating of 100% based on 29 reviews, with an average rating of 7.6/10. The website's critical consensus states: "Kilo Two Bravo honours its fact-based story with an almost unbearably tense drama that captures the horrors -- and the human cost -- of modern warfare."

Accolades
At the 2015 BAFTA Scotland Awards (ceremony 15 November 2015) David Elliot won as Best Actor in Film.
At the 2015 British Independent Film Awards (ceremony 6 December 2015) 
Paul Katis (director/producer) and Andrew de Lotbinière (producer) won as Producer of the Year for work on this film and were also nominated
at the 2015 British Academy Film Awards (ceremony 8 February 2015)
as Outstanding Debut by a British Writer, Director or Producer.

References

External links
 
 
 

2014 films
2014 war drama films
British war drama films
Films set in Afghanistan
Films shot in Jordan
War in Afghanistan (2001–2021) films
2014 drama films
2014 directorial debut films
2010s English-language films
2010s British films